Masonboro Sound Historic District is a national historic district located near Wilmington, New Hanover County, North Carolina. The district encompasses 22 contributing buildings, 2 contributing sites, 8 contributing structures, and 1 contributing object near Wilmington.  The district developed during the 19th and early-20th century and includes notable examples of Italian Renaissance and Colonial Revival style architecture.  There are 10 contributing dwellings and 13 contributing outbuildings. Notable dwellings include the Carr-Ormand House (1932), Willard-Sprunt-Woolvin House (1880), Cazaux-Williams-Crow House (Halcyon Hall, 1877, 1880s, 1937), Parsley-Love House (Hickory Hill, 1885, 1912), Live Oaks (1913), Taylor-Bissinger House (1937), the "Doll House" (1924), and Hill-Anderson Cottage (c. 1835).

It was listed on the National Register of Historic Places in 1992.

References

Houses on the National Register of Historic Places in North Carolina
Historic districts on the National Register of Historic Places in North Carolina
Colonial Revival architecture in North Carolina
Renaissance Revival architecture in North Carolina
Buildings and structures in Wilmington, North Carolina
National Register of Historic Places in New Hanover County, North Carolina
Houses in New Hanover County, North Carolina